Starleague may refer to:

 StarCraft II StarLeague a South Korean StarCraft II tournament
 Ongamenet Starleague, a South Korean StarCraft individual league

See also
 
 MBCGame StarCraft League
 Qatar Stars League, a football league